Bozar may refer to:

 Bozar, Texas
 The Centre for Fine Arts, Brussels (French: Palais des Beaux-Arts, Dutch: Paleis voor Schone Kunsten)
 12270 Bozar, a minor planet